Charles Parnell may refer to:

 Charles Parnell (actor) (born 1964), American actor
 Charles Stewart Parnell (1846–1891), Irish nationalist politician

See also
 Charles Purnell, New Zealand soldier, lawyer, and publisher